Xiadian may refer to the following locations in China:

 Xiadian, Huoqiu County (夏店镇), town in Huoqiu County, Anhui
 Xiadian, Dachang County (夏垫镇), town in Dachang Hui Autonomous County, Hebei
 Xiadian, Zhaoyuan, Shandong (夏甸镇), town in Zhaoyuan, Shandong
 Xiadian, Xiangyuan County (夏店镇), town in Xiangyuan County, Shanxi
 Xiadian Township (夏店乡), Ruzhou, Henan